The cystohepatic triangle (or hepatobiliary triangle) is an anatomic space bordered by the cystic duct inferiorly, the common hepatic duct medially, and the inferior surface of the liver superiorly. The cystic artery lies within the hepatobiliary triangle, which is used to locate it during a laparoscopic cholecystectomy.

Structure 
The hepatobiliary triangle is the area bound by the:
 cystic duct inferiorly.
 common hepatic duct medially.
 inferior margin of the liver superiorly.

It is covered in peritoneum both anteriorly and posteriorly. It contains the cystic artery and cystic lymph nodes. The right hepatic artery may also pass through the hepatobiliary triangle.

Clinical significance

General surgeons frequently quiz medical students on this term and the name for the lymph node located within the triangle, Mascagni's lymph node or Lund's node, however many often erroneously refer to it as "Calot's node". The latter is frequently enlarged due to inflammation of the gallbladder (e.g. cholecystitis) or the biliary tract (e.g. cholangitis) and may be removed along with the gallbladder during surgical treatment (cholecystectomy).

The cystic artery lies within the hepatobiliary triangle, which is used to locate it during a laparoscopic cholecystectomy. It may also contain an accessory right hepatic artery or an anomalous sectoral bile ducts. As a result, dissection in the triangle of Calot is ill-advised until the lateral-most structures have been cleared and identification of the cystic duct is definitive. According to SESAP 12 (produced and distributed by the American College of Surgeons) dissection in the triangle of Calot is the most common cause of common bile duct injuries.

History 
Another name used to refer to the hepatobiliary triangle is Calot's triangle, after Jean-François Calot.  Calot's original description of the triangle in 1891 included the cystic duct, the common hepatic duct, and the cystic artery (not the inferior border of the liver as is commonly believed).

References 

6. Bailey & Love's Short Practice of Surgery 26th edition (see page 1098).

Abdomen
Hepatology